Apsectrotanypus is a genus of midges in the family Chironomidae. There are about six described species in Apsectrotanypus.

Species
These six species belong to the genus Apsectrotanypus:
 Apsectrotanypus algens (Coquillett, 1902) i c g
 Apsectrotanypus johnsoni (Coquillett, 1901) i c g b
 Apsectrotanypus maculosus (Freeman, 1961) c
 Apsectrotanypus trifascipennis (Zetterstedt, 1838) i c g
 Apsectrotanypus unicolor (Freeman, 1954) c g
 Apsectrotanypus yoshimurai (Tokunaga, 1937) c g
Data sources: i = ITIS, c = Catalogue of Life, g = GBIF, b = Bugguide.net

References

Further reading

External links

 
 

Tanypodinae